Pseudosybra cristata is a species of beetle in the family Cerambycidae, and the only species in the genus Pseudosybra. It was described by Breuning in 1939.

References

Apomecynini
Beetles described in 1939
Monotypic beetle genera